The Grand Island Independent is a newspaper published in Grand Island, Nebraska.  The Independent is published seven days a week but does not produce a newspaper on Christmas Day. Its daily circulation is 20,500, in eleven counties of central Nebraska.
The newspaper is owned by the Omaha World-Herald Co.

History

In 1869, Maggie Eberhart and Seth Mobley founded the Platte Valley Independent in North Platte.  Eberhart, whose parents had immigrated from Ireland in her infancy, had been a teacher;   
Mobley had begun working in a newspaper office in Iowa at the age of 10, and had briefly published the Fort Kearney Herald, while stationed at Fort Kearny, Nebraska in 1865. 
he was one of the original settlers of Grand Island in 1857.
He had served as County Judge and as a member of the Nebraska Territorial Legislature.
Beside the Independent, he owned a lumberyard and a general store.
Hedde converted the Independent from a weekly to a daily in 1884;
in 1885, he changed its name to the Grand Island Daily Independent.

In 1900, the octogenarian Hedde's health was failing, prompting him to turn the newspaper over to a group of Grand Island businessmen, who formed the Independent Publishing Company.  A. F. Buechler served as president of the company and editor of the newspaper until 1930,
when it was sold to Oscar S. Stauffer; he continued as editor until 1939.

Stauffer Communications owned the Independent from 1930 to 1994.   
In 1974, the newspaper made the conversion from letterpress to offset printing.  In 1979, it began printing a Sunday edition, initiating seven-day publication.
In 1989, the "Daily" was dropped, leaving the newspaper with its present name.

The newspaper was acquired by the Morris Publishing Group in the course of their 1995 purchase of Stauffer.
It introduced its website in 1996.
In 2007, the Independent was bought by GateHouse Media.
in 2008, GateHouse sold the newspaper to its present owner, the Omaha World-Herald Co.

The Independent today

The publisher of the Independent is Terrie Baker; Prior to serving as publisher, Baker served as The Independent's general manager for two years. She joined the Independent in 2017 after serving as publisher of the North Platte Telegraph since 2015.
The managing editor is Jim Faddis; he had worked for the Independent for 25 years before being promoted from editorial page editor to managing editor in 2007.

Beside the daily newspaper, the Independent publishes a free-circulation weekly titled Trade West, with a circulation of about 20,000, focusing on "rural and agricultural readers".

References

External links

 
 

1870 establishments in Nebraska
Daily newspapers published in the United States
Grand Island, Nebraska
Lee Enterprises publications
Newspapers published in Nebraska
Publications established in 1870